Gilles Tréhin (born 1972) is a French artist, author, and creator of the imaginary city of "Urville". His book, also titled Urville, is based on his writings of the fictional city's history, geography, culture, and economy, and includes over 300 drawings of different districts of Urville, all done by Trehin.

Tréhin is an autistic savant who lives in Cagnes-sur-Mer, near Nice, in southeastern France.

See also
Outsider art

References

External links
 "Urville" - the book
 Gilles Trehin's Official Website

1972 births
Autistic savants
French artists
Living people
Outsider artists
Artists with autism